Radiomás is the state radio network of the Mexican state of Veracruz. It broadcasts on five FM transmitters in the state with most content originating from the state capital in Xalapa.

History
Radiomás came to air on April 6, 2000 with music and pre-recorded IDs. Program production began by that July.

Transmitters

The two lowest-powered transmitters in the network, XHIXH-FM 107.3 Ixhuatlán de Madero (400 watts) and XHSTX-FM 89.7 Santiago Tuxtla (167 watts), were shut down and their permits surrendered on December 21, 2016.

References

Radio stations in Veracruz
Radio stations established in 2000
Public radio in Mexico